Nick St. Nicholas (born Klaus Karl Kassbaum on September 28, 1943) is a German bandleader, bass guitarist, singer and songwriter; best known for his partnership in Steppenwolf.

Early life
He was born in Plön, Schleswig-Holstein, Germany and his family moved to Toronto after World War II and became Canadian citizens.  His sister Maren joined The Royal Conservatory of Music, (Canadian Ballet Company & Conservatory of Music), as a pianist.  He also has a younger brother, Gary who entered the Merchant navy.

Early career
Kassbaum spent a brief period as bassist with the Epics, then Shirley Matthews and the Big Town Boys before organizing a set of musicians who eventually coalesced as the Mynah Birds, featuring singers Rick James, Neil Young and Jimmy Livingston.

In 1965, Kassbaum replaced Bruce Palmer as bassist with Jack London and the Sparrows, became Nick St. Nicholas, and played on most of the tracks on their only LP, which was released in that year.  As the band leader, St. Nicholas hired East Prussian-born front man John Kay when Jack London left The Sparrows, and they became Sparrow.  He moved the band south to New York for a modest record deal with Columbia Records, then drove Sparrow non-stop to California.

St. Nicholas was one of the driving forces in music of the hippie counterculture movement, the Summer of Love.  Having booked the band at the Matrix club in San Francisco, on May 14, 1967, two live shows were recorded, including a 20-minute version of "The Pusher." These are the live recordings released by ABC Dunhill Records as Early Steppenwolf.

In 1967 St. Nicholas also joined a Los Angeles-based group called The Hardtimes, who soon renamed themselves T.I.M.E., which stands for Trust in Men Everywhere.  Capitol Records signed them to a $500,000 recording contract, but their manager, the now deceased Ron Levin, turned out to be a con man and absconded with the advance and all of the band's earnings.

Prior to the formation of the Steppenwolf partnership in 1968, music producer-arranger Gabriel Mekler changed the name from Sparrow to Steppenwolf based on a book he was reading at the time by Hermann Hesse.

Steppenwolf
After having recorded two albums without him, St. Nicholas's Sparrow bandmates, (vocalist/guitarist John Kay, drummer Jerry Edmonton and organist Goldy McJohn) came to see him perform with T.I.M.E. at the Whisky a Go Go on the Sunset Strip and asked him to leave T.I.M.E. to rejoin them as Steppenwolf.

"1967, John Kay, Jerry Edmonton, Michael Monarch and Goldie McJohn formed a musical band called ‘Steppenwolf.’ In 1968, Nicholas Kassbaum, who is professionally known as ‘Nick St. Nicholas,’ joined Steppenwolf as a bass player. That year, the band members entered into a partnership agreement whereby the members became co-equal partners and owners in Steppenwolf, and agreed to share equally the band's expenses and income. Also in 1968, the band members signed a recording agreement with Dunhill Records both as partners and as Steppenwolf band members. From late 1968 until late April 1970, Steppenwolf, with Kassbaum as its bass player, toured the world in concerts and recorded Steppenwolf 's well-received music. Kassbaum appeared prominently on Steppenwolf record album covers and authored Steppenwolf compositions. In 1970, John Kay, who had asserted control over Steppenwolf, excluded Kassbaum from the band." –
9th Circuit 

St. Nicholas has several Gold and Platinum records to his credit playing and contributing on four Steppenwolf albums: At Your Birthday Party, Early Steppenwolf, Monster, and Steppenwolf Live.  He performed on many television shows as a member of Steppenwolf, including The Ed Sullivan Show, August 17, 1968 where the band performed a medley of "Born to Be Wild" / "Magic Carpet Ride" and a complete version of "It's Never Too Late", The Smothers Brothers, American Bandstand, Playboy After Dark, Beat Club, Della, Upbeat, and The Steve Allen Show, as well as VH1's Behind The Music.  St. Nicholas was squeezed out of Steppenwolf in a power play by Kay in 1971. Grammy Awards board member and former manager of T.I.M.E. Jeff Greenberg came to see St. Nicholas to inform him that Steppenwolf was at a rehearsal at SIR Studios with a new bassist, George Biondo.  More than twenty years of still-unresolved litigation followed.

Following St. Nicholas's ouster from Steppenwolf, he replaced Dickie Peterson in Blue Cheer alongside Ruben De Fuentes on guitar and Terry Rae on drums.  The band both toured and recorded during this time, but the songs were not released until Live & Unreleased '68/'74 was released in 1996.

After Kay and Edmonton's version of Steppenwolf disbanded in 1976, St. Nicholas reformed the group with McJohn and guitarist Kent Henry, who had replaced Larry Byrom in the group and recorded the guitar tracks on the For Ladies Only album in 1971.  There were several other versions of this band touring at the same time for which St. Nicholas was not responsible.  During this time, St. Nicholas's Steppenwolf included drummers such as Steve Riley and Frankie Banali.

St. Nicholas stopped touring with Steppenwolf in 1980 due to legal actions by Kay.

Post-Steppenwolf
In 1980 St. Nicholas formed a band called Starwolf with keyboardist Steve Stewart along with drummer Dean Woytcke.  Stewart left in the late 1980s and Randy Carr joined; about the same time guitarist Dave Olsen joined and Starwolf became Lone Wolf.  In 1988, Kurt Griffey was added as a second guitarist and Chris Sweeney joined as the band's drummer.  After Lone Wolf became The Wolf continuing from 1988 to 1989, Ronnie Carson took over for Sweeney and Olsen left.

In the early 1990s, St. Nicholas formed a new Lone Wolf with Griffey, singer Richard Ward, and drummer Daryl Johnson, featuring at bike rallies and clubs, continuing until 1997.

World Classic Rockers
In 1997 St. Nicholas began a new heavy metal chapter as he launched the supergroup World Classic Rockers, bringing Griffey with him into the new venture along with Sparrow and Steppenwolf bandmate Michael Monarch.  Members include former members of Steppenwolf, Santana, Toto, Journey, Lynyrd Skynyrd, Boston, Kansas, Eagles and others. The World Classic Rockers (WCR) prepare to celebrate the 20-year anniversary.

"My son was in a band called Under The Influence of Giants. You guys are the giants. You influenced a whole generation of music."
KUSI Good Morning San Diego anchorman Carlos Amezcua.

Personal life
Nick St. Nicholas has played the accordion since childhood.  He enjoys riding his "beautiful 100th Anniversary Harley Davidson Springer along the California coastline."  St. Nicholas appreciates the Wild West motif he first encountered in Colorado while touring.  He is a dog lover.

St. Nicholas has three sons, Michael, Jesse, and Devin.

Studio albums
T.I.M.E.1968Liberty Records
At Your Birthday Party1969U.S. #7GoldDunhill Records
Monster1969U.S. #17U.K. #43GoldDunhill Records
Live & Unreleased '68/'741996Captain Trip Records
Country Magic1984Gold Star Records

Live albums
Early Steppenwolf1969 (recorded in 1967 as The Sparrow)U.S. #29Dunhill Records
Steppenwolf Live1970U.S. #7U.K. #16GoldDunhill Records
World Classic Rockers: Live (1st edition)WCR Records
World Classic Rockers: Live (2nd edition)WCR Records
World Classic Rockers: Live (3rd edition)WCR Records
World Classic Rockers: Live (4th edition)WCR Records
World Classic Rockers: Live (5th edition)WCR Records
World Classic Rockers: Live (6th edition)WCR Records
Blue Cheer Live & Unreleased, Vol. 1: '68/'74 (1996; Captain Trip Records)

Compilations
Gold: Their Great Hits1971U.S. #24GoldDunhill Records
Rest in Peace1972U.S. #62Dunhill Records
16 Greatest Hits1973U.S. #152GoldDunhill Records
The ABC Collection1976ABC Records
Born to Be Wild - A Retrospective1991MCA Records
All Time Greatest Hits1999MCA Records
20th Century Masters - The Millennium Collection: The Best of Steppenwolf2000GoldUniversal Music Group
Steppenwolf Gold2005Geffen Records

Singles

External links
World Classic Rockers, official site

(IMDB), VH1 Behind The Music Steppenwolf

References

1944 births
Living people
People from Plön (district)
German emigrants to Canada
Blue Cheer members
Steppenwolf (band) members
German rock bass guitarists
Male bass guitarists
German male guitarists
World Classic Rockers members